Sirex is a genus of wasps in the family Siricidae, the horntails or wood wasps. They inject eggs with fungal endosymbionts into wood. The fungus is contained in a mycangium which nourishes it with secretions, and in turn it digests wood for the wasp larva.

The genus includes economically important pests; S. noctilio, known simply as the 'Sirex woodwasp' is an invasive species, having spread widely across the world from its original range.

Species

 Sirex abietinus Goulet, 2012
 Sirex areolatus (Cresson, 1868)
 Sirex behrensii (Cresson, 1880)
 Sirex californicus (Ashmead, 1904)
 Sirex carinthiacus Konow, 1892
 Sirex cyaneus Fabricius, 1781
 Sirex ermak (Semenov, 1921)
 Sirex hispaniola Goulet, 2012
 Sirex juvencus (Linnaeus, 1758)
 Sirex longicauda Middlekauff, 1948
 Sirex mexicanus Smith, 2012
 Sirex mongolorum (Semenov)
 Sirex nigricornis Fabricius, 1781
 Sirex nitidus (Harris, 1841)
 Sirex nitobei Matsumura
 Sirex noctilio Fabricius, 1793
 Sirex obesus Bradley, 1913
 Sirex sinicus Maa
 Sirex tianshanicus (Semenov)
 Sirex torvus Harris, 1779
 Sirex varipes Walker, 1866
 Sirex vates Mocsáry
 Sirex xerophilus Schiff, 2012

References

Further reading
Hajek, A. E., et al. (2013). Fidelity among Sirex woodwasps and their fungal symbionts. Microb. Ecol. 65(3) 753–62.

Siricidae